Michelangelo Sapiano (March 19, 1826 – December 2, 1912) was a Maltese clock maker and inventor born in Mqabba, Malta.

Early life
Michelangelo Sapiano was born in Mqabba in 1826. When he was 14 years of age he opened a watch repair shop and at such a young age he managed to repair the clock found in the Parish Church of Mqabba when other clock makers couldn’t do so. This paved the way for him to become famous and gave him the courage to start making clocks. He went to live in Luqa when he was 21 years of age after he married a girl from the town.

Achievements
Sapiano is most famous for large clocks which were made for churches, convents and sacristies in various towns and villages in Malta and Gozo and also for a large clock he made for the Church of Saint Catherine of Alexandria in Egypt.

His masterpiece is a grandfather clock which till a few years ago could be found in No.11, Pawlu Magri Street, Luqa, the house (which still exists) where Michelangelo Sapiano used to live after he married. The clock can now be found in the Mdina Cathedral Museum. For this clock he was awarded a silver medal in an Industrial Exhibition which was held in 1864. Apart from showing the time, days and date this clock also shows the phases of the moon and the time at which the sun rises and goes down. This clock also has a mechanism which marks when a year is a leap year.

Sapiano made other interesting inventions. He invented an alarm clock, which at the time of ringing, produced a spark and lighted a candle to show the time. Another clock he invented had a moving globe with the world map, and every half an hour it showed the position of the world in relation to the sun. He made other precision instruments, including a balance for the Malta Customs, to take weights from 700 lbs down to a fraction of an ounce. For his wife he made a mechanical egg timer with a bell, and to know the time at night he devised a mantel clock to which a long string was attached which would chime the most recent time when pulled in the darkness.

Sapiano was awarded a certificate and a gold medal by the Society of Arts, Manufacture and Commerce on the 26 February 1908. He died on the 2 December 1912.

References

Maltese artisans
1826 births
1912 deaths
Maltese clockmakers
People from Mqabba